Adriano Belmiro Duarte Nicolau best known for his nickname Yano, is an Angolan footballer who plays as a striker for Angolan premier league side Petro de Luanda.

In 2019-20, he signed in for Petro de Luanda in the Angolan league, the Girabola.

International career

International goals
Scores and results list Angola's goal tally first.

References

External links
 

1992 births
Living people
Angolan footballers
People from Lunda Sul Province
Angola international footballers
Atlético Petróleos de Luanda players
Progresso Associação do Sambizanga players
Association football forwards
2016 African Nations Championship players
Angola A' international footballers